The Aeronautical Institute of Bangladesh or AIB is an aviation school in Bangladesh. AIB is the first private aeronautical institute in Bangladesh. The institute is under the Civil Aviation Authority of Bangladesh and governed by the Bangladesh Technical Education Board and Civil Aviation Authority of Bangladesh.

History
AIB was established in 1999. The institute started its program from Sector-4, Uttara Model Town, Dhaka. Now it is situated in  Sector-13, Uttara Model Town, Dhaka-1230.

The institute received BTEB approval in 2004 and CAAB approval in 2004 and has been government approved by the Bangladesh Technical Education Board as well as approved by the Civil Aviation Authority of Bangladesh.

The AIB is run by the College Code – 50158 and is the only Civil Aviation Authority of Bangladesh-approved private aviation training institute in Bangladesh.

Campus

AIB is located at Uttara Model Town near to Hazrat Shajalal International Airport, in Sector-13, Road no. 01, in front of lake.

Courses
The institute offers 4 year Diploma in Aircraft Maintenance Engineering with following specializations:  
 Aerospace  
 Avionics

It also offers the following basic and refresher courses:
 Airworthiness Legislation
 Human Performance and Limitations
 Rotorcraft Short Course
 Piston Engine Short Course
 AC Power Short Course
 DC Power Short Course
 Airworthiness Legislation Refresher
 Airframe Refresher
 Turbine Engine Refresher
 DC Power & AC Power Refresher
 General Aircraft Instrument & Integrated Flight Systems Refresher
 Human Performance and Limitations Refresher
 Basic Radio - Radar Refresher

♦ Special Course: 
 Aviation Management 
 Cabin Crew & Air Hostage
 Reservations & e-Ticketing
 Travel and Tourism

Lab and workshop
The institute has a well-designed and -equipped electrical lab, high-speed WiFi computer lab, electronics and digital lab, instrumentation lab, power plant shop, general workshop, airframe workshop, component shop and tools store.

Library and Cyber Center
AIB library has 2,000+ books and magazines and journals. This Institute has well designed a cyber center for Information Technology.

Students organizations

 AIB Alumni Association - AAA
 AIB Aeromodeling Club

See also 
List of aerospace engineering schools
Dhaka Polytechnic Institute

References

External links
 
Civil Aviation Authority of Bangladesh
Technical Education Board

Educational institutions of Uttara
Vocational education in Bangladesh
Aviation in Bangladesh
Colleges in Dhaka District
Aerospace engineering organizations
Educational institutions established in 1999
1999 establishments in Bangladesh